Kuaishou is a users short video-sharing mobile app, a social network, and video special effects editor, based in Haidian District (Beijing), developed in 2011 by Beijing Kuaishou Technology, by engineers Hua Su (宿华) and Cheng Yixiao (程一笑).

As of 2019, it has a worldwide user base of over 200 million, leading the "Most Downloaded" lists of the Google Play and Apple App Store in eight countries, such as Brazil. In Pakistan and Indonesia, this app is known as Snack Video. It is often referred to as "Kwai" in overseas markets. Its main competitor is Douyin, which is known as TikTok outside China.

Kuaishou's overseas team is led by the former CEO of the application 99, and staff from Google, Facebook, Netflix and TikTok were recruited to lead the company's international expansion.

The China Internet Investment Fund, a state-owned enterprise controlled by the Cyberspace Administration of China, holds a partial ownership stake in Kuaishou.

History 
Kuaishou is China's first short video platform. developed in 2011  by engineer Hua Su and Cheng Yixiao. Prior to co-founding Kuaishou, Su Hua had worked for both Google and Baidu as a software engineer. The company is headquartered in Haidian District, Beijing. 

Kuaishou's predecessor "GIF Kuaishou" was founded in March 2011. GIF Kuaishou was a mobile app with which users could make and share GIF pictures. In November 2012, Kuaishou became a short video community and a platform with which users could record and share videos. By 2013, the app had reached 100 million daily users. By 2019, it exceeded 200 million active daily users.

In March 2017, Kuaishou closed a US$350 million investment round that was led by Tencent. In January 2018, Forbes estimated the company's valuation to be US$18 billion.

In April 2018, Kuaishou's app was briefly banned from Chinese app stores after China Central Television reported on the platform popularizing videos of teenage mothers.

In 2019, the company announced a partnership with the People's Daily, an official newspaper of the Chinese Communist Party, to help it experiment with the use of artificial intelligence in news.

In June 2020, the Government of India banned Kwai along with 58 other apps, citing "data and privacy issues".  The 2020 border tensions between India and China might have also played a role in the ban, there having been an increasingly political "Boycott China" movement in India due to the competitive relations between the two countries in recent years.

In January 2021, Kuaishou announced it was planning an initial public offering (IPO) to raise approximately US$5 billion. Kuaishou's stock completed its first day of trading at $300 Hong Kong dollars (HKD) (US$38.70), more than doubling its initial offer price, and causing its market value to rise to over $1 trillion HKD (US$159 billion).

In February 2021, shares of Kuaishou rose 194% at the opening on its Hong Kong debut. Kuaishou was one of the companies worse-hit by the regulatory restrictions on Chinese internet companies and its share price fell nearly 80% from its highest point since going public. In December 2021, it was announced Kuaishou would lay off 30% of its staff, mainly mid-level employees with an annual salary of US$157,000 or more. The reorganization was done to help Kuaishou cut costs and reverse losses.

In October 2022, state-owned Beijing Radio and Television Station took a minority ownership stake in Kuaishou.

Popularity 
Compared to Douyin, Kuaishou is more popular with older users who live outside China's Tier 1 cities. Its initial popularity came from videos of Chinese rural life. Kuaishou also relies more on e-commerce revenue than on advertising revenue compared to its main competitor. Unlike Douyin, Kuaishou's algorithm rewards content creators boasting a highly engaged user base.

See also 
List of Kuaishou original programming
List of content platforms by monthly active users

References

External links
 

Companies based in Beijing
Chinese companies established in 2011
Internet properties established in 2011
Mobile applications
Tencent
Video software
Social networking services
Video game streaming services
Live streaming services
2021 initial public offerings
Companies listed on the Hong Kong Stock Exchange
Internet censorship in India